Emilia di Girolamo is a British television screenwriter and published author. Di Girolamo has also written for The Guardian newspaper and blog.

Early life
Di Girolamo got a First in Drama and a PhD in the rehabilitation of offenders using drama based techniques from Middlesex University.

Writing career
She started writing for the popular long-running drama EastEnders in 2008 before joining Law & Order: UK in 2009. She joined the core writing team of Law & Order UK for series 3&4 and took over as Co-Producer and Lead Writer for series 5&6. She penned 13 episodes in total but announced she was leaving at the end of season 6 to pursue other projects. She returned as a guest writer to write a two part season opener for season 7, "Tracks" and "Tremors".

Emilia joined The Tunnel as showrunner for season 3, titled The Tunnel: Vengeance, airing in December 2017 (Kudos/Sky Atlantic).
 Afterwards she wrote the script for one episode of the period drama Medici: Masters of Florence.

In 2021, she wrote the television drama miniseries Deceit. She is also the executive producer and writer of the police drama series Three Pines, which premiered on Amazon Prime Video.

References

External links

 Interview for Huffington Post

Living people
English television producers
English television writers
British women television writers
English screenwriters
English soap opera writers
English bloggers
English people of Italian descent
British people of Italian descent
British women television producers
British women bloggers
Year of birth missing (living people)
Alumni of Middlesex University
Women soap opera writers
21st-century British screenwriters